Aspergillus christenseniae is a species of fungus in the genus Aspergillus. It is from the Cervini section. The species was first described in 2016. It has been reported to produce 4-hydroxymellein, terremutin, orange-red anthraquinone, and chlorflavonin.  The species was named for Martha Christensen.

Growth and morphology

A. christenseniae has been cultivated on both Czapek yeast extract agar (CYA) plates and Malt Extract Agar Oxoid® (MEAOX) plates. The growth morphology of the colonies can be seen in the pictures below.

References 

christenseniae
Fungi described in 2016